Marcelle may refer to:
Marcelle, a French feminine version of Marcel
1300 Marcelle (1934 CL), a main-belt asteroid
Groupe Marcelle, a Canadian cosmetics company
Marcelle Tiard (1861-1932), French Esperantist

See also
 Marcel (disambiguation)
 Marcell (disambiguation)